Chalta Musafir is an Urdu novel by Pakistani novelist and short story writer Altaf Fatima. First published in 1981, the novel explains the events of 1940s to 1970s, from the partition of the Indian subcontinent to the independence of Bangladesh.

References 

Urdu-language novels
20th-century Pakistani novels